Preston is a city in Jackson County, Iowa, United States. The population was 949 at the time of the 2020 census.

History
Preston got its start in the year 1870, following construction of the railroad through that territory.

Preston is named for one of its founders, I. M. Preston. Those present at the time of the town's platting were allowed to name Preston's streets after themselves.

Geography
Preston is located at  (42.050332, -90.394681).

Demographics

2010 census
As of the census of 2010, there were 1,012 people, 418 households, and 280 families residing in the city. The racial makeup of the city was 98.6% White, 0.5% African American, and 0.9% from two or more races. Hispanic or Latino of any race were 0.6% of the population.

There were 418 households, of which 33.3% had children under the age of 18 living with them, 53.6% were married couples living together, 9.8% had a female householder with no husband present, 3.6% had a male householder with no wife present, and 33.0% were non-families. 29.4% of all households were made up of individuals, and 17.7% had someone living alone who was 65 years of age or older. The average household size was 2.42 and the average family size was 2.97.

The median age in the city was 39.2 years. 25.9% of residents were under the age of 18; 6.3% were between the ages of 18 and 24; 25.2% were from 25 to 44; 24.6% were from 45 to 64; and 17.7% were 65 years of age or older. The gender makeup of the city was 48.8% male and 51.2% female.

2000 census
As of the census of 2000, there were 949 people, 417 households, and 250 families residing in the city. The racial makeup of the city was 99.89% White and 0.11% Pacific Islander. Hispanic or Latino of any race were 0.11% of the population.

There were 417 households, out of which 29.0% had children under the age of 18 living with them, 51.1% were married couples living together, 7.0% had a female householder with no husband present, and 40.0% were non-families. 35.7% of all households were made up of individuals, and 20.6% had someone living alone who was 65 years of age or older. The average household size was 2.26 and the average family size was 2.97.

Age spread:  23.1% under the age of 18, 10.1% from 18 to 24, 28.8% from 25 to 44, 20.3% from 45 to 64, and 17.7% who were 65 years of age or older. The median age was 37 years. For every 100 females, there were 90.9 males. For every 100 females age 18 and over, there were 89.1 males.

The median income for a household in the city was $35,909, and the median income for a family was $47,375. Males had a median income of $32,150 versus $22,031 for females. The per capita income for the city was $17,639. About 4.0% of families and 6.8% of the population were below the poverty line, including 7.7% of those under age 18 and 14.6% of those age 65 or over.

Education
Preston is a part of the Easton Valley Community School District, formed in 2013 by the merger of the Preston Community School District and the East Central Community School District of the towns of Miles and Sabula.

The enrollment of the school was 375 in the year 2017.

Notable people  

 Al Feuerbach, former track and field athlete, who competed in the men's shot put event at the 1972 and 1976 Summer Olympics.
 Bob Oldis, scout for the Florida Marlins and a former professional baseball player
 Fred Schule (1879–1962) 1904 Olympic gold medalist in hurdles
 Roger Stewart, Iowa State Senator.

References

External links
 

Preston Iowa Portal style website – Government, Business, Churches and more
City-Data Comprehensive Statistical Data and more about Preston

Cities in Jackson County, Iowa
Cities in Iowa
1870 establishments in Iowa
Populated places established in 1870